Heinz Wirz (born 5 February 1939) is a Swiss former field hockey player. He competed in the men's tournament at the 1960 Summer Olympics.

References

External links
 

1939 births
Living people
Swiss male field hockey players
Olympic field hockey players of Switzerland
Field hockey players at the 1960 Summer Olympics
People from Olten
Sportspeople from the canton of Solothurn